Laundi  was a constituency of the Madhya Pradesh Legislative Assembly in Madhya Pradesh state in central India. It was in existence from 1957 to 1977 after which it was subsumed by Chandla and Maharajpur constituencies. It was one of the 6 Vidhan Sabha constituencies located in Chhatarpur district. It consisted of the entire Laundi tehsil of the district.

Members of Legislative Assembly

See also
 Lavkushnagar

References

Chhatarpur district
Former assembly constituencies of Madhya Pradesh